Rolf Meier (born 26 April 1969) is a retired Swiss football midfielder.

While at FC Aarau he was part of the side that won the Swiss national title in 1992–93.

References

1969 births
Living people
Swiss men's footballers
FC Aarau players
FC St. Gallen players
FC Baden players
FC Wangen bei Olten players
FC Wohlen players
Association football midfielders
Swiss Super League players